is a Japanese table tennis player. She was born in Utsunomiya. She competed in women's doubles at the 2000 Summer Olympics in Sydney, and in women's singles and women's doubles at the 2004 Summer Olympics in Athens.

References

External links

1982 births
Living people
People from Utsunomiya, Tochigi
Sportspeople from Tochigi Prefecture
Japanese female table tennis players
Olympic table tennis players of Japan
Table tennis players at the 2000 Summer Olympics
Table tennis players at the 2004 Summer Olympics
Table tennis players at the 2006 Asian Games
20th-century Japanese women
21st-century Japanese women